Boces is the second album by Mercury Rev, released in 1993. It was their final album with frontman David Baker, who was asked to leave shortly after the supporting tour concluded. The title is derived from the Boards of Cooperative Educational Services system of vocational schools in New York.

During the tour (on Lollapalooza) for this album, the band were forced off the stage for being too loud.

Track listing
 "Meth of a Rockette's Kick" – 10:29
 "Trickle Down" – 5:04
 "Bronx Cheer" – 2:49
 "Boys Peel Out" – 4:28
 "Downs Are Feminine Balloons" – 6:29
 "Something for Joey" – 4:06
 "Snorry Mouth" – 10:55
 "Hi-Speed Boats" – 4:00
 "Continuous Drunks and Blunders" – 0:48
 "Girlfren" – 4:41

All songs written by Mercury Rev.

Personnel
 Jimy Chambers – Drumming, AtlasSweepstakes
 Jonathan Donahue – Silver Pickup Guitar, Vocals between Ventolin hits
 Grasshopper – Dither Guitar, Licorice Stick
 Suzanne Thorpe – Rooster Tail Bass Flute, Chevron Fife
 Dave Fridmann – Bass Explore, Exhaled band-with Magnetics
 David Baker – Vocals

References

Mercury Rev albums
1993 albums
Albums produced by Dave Fridmann